Crucea de Piatră may refer to:

 Crucea de Piatră, a red-light district in interbellum Bucharest
 Crucea de Piatră, a village in Călugăreni, Giurgiu